The 103rd Infantry Division "Piacenza" was an infantry division of the Royal Italian Army during World War II. The Piacenza was named for the city of Piacenza and classified as an auto-transportable division, meaning it had some motorized transport, but not enough to move the entire division at once.

History

World War I 
The division's lineage begins with the Brigade "Piacenza" raised on 15 March 1915 with the 111th and 112th infantry regiments. The brigade fought on the Italian front in World War I and was disbanded after the war in October 1920.

World War II 
The 103rd Infantry Division "Piacenza" was activated in Bolzano on 15 March 1942 and consisted of the 111th and 112th infantry regiments, and the 80th Artillery Regiment. As a division raised during the war the Piacenza did not have its own regimental depots and therefore its regiments were raised by the depots of the 102nd Motorized Division "Trento": the 111th Infantry Regiment "Piacenza" was raised in Trento on 1 January 1942 by the 61st Infantry Regiment "Trento" and the 112th Infantry Regiment "Piacenza" was raised in Trento on 1 January 1942 by the 62nd Infantry Regiment "Trento", while the 108th Motorized Artillery Regiment was raised in Trento by the 46th Motorized Artillery Regiment "Trento".

In June 1942 the division exchanged artillery regiments with the 5th Infantry Division "Cosseria", which needed a fully motorized and modern equipped artillery regiment for its deployment to the Soviet Union: the Piacenza ceded the 108th Motorized Artillery Regiment equipped with modern 75/18 Mod. 34 howitzers to the Cosseria and received the 37th Artillery Regiment equipped with World War I vintage 75/27 Mod. 06 field guns in return.

In June 1942 the division moved to Cuneo and Borgo San Dalmazzo in Southern Piedmont and Rivarolo in Liguria. In November 1942 the entire Piacenza moved to Liguria after the XXII Army Corps and its units guarding the Ligurian coast participated in the occupation of Southern France and remained there afterwards as Italian occupation force. In Liguria the Piacenza formed the mobile reserve behind the 201st Coastal Division in the area of Vado Ligure, Savona, Varazze, and Genova.

After the fall of Sicily the division was transferred to Southern Lazio as mobile reserve in the area between the river Garigliano and the city of Ardea. The division's headquarters was at Velletri. After the Armistice of Cassibile was announced on 8 September 1943 the division began to disintegrate and by 12 September its remnants were dissolved by the invading Germans.

Organization 
  103rd Infantry Division "Piacenza"
 111th Infantry Regiment "Piacenza"
 Command Company
 3x Fusilier battalions
 Support Weapons Company (65/17 infantry support guns)
 Mortar Company (81mm Mod. 35 mortars)
 112th Infantry Regiment "Piacenza"
 Command Company
 3x Fusilier battalions
 Support Weapons Company (65/17 infantry support guns)
 Mortar Company (81mm Mod. 35 mortars)
 37th Artillery Regiment "Piacenza", in Albenga (transferred from the 5th Infantry Division "Cosseria" in June 1942)
 Command Unit
 I Group (100/17 howitzers; re-equipped with 105/28 guns in late 1942)
 II Group (75/27 field guns; re-equipped with 75/18 Mod. 35 howitzers in late 1942)
 III Group (75/27 field guns; re-equipped with 75/18 Mod. 35 howitzers in late 1942)
 1x Anti-aircraft battery (20/65 Mod. 35 anti-aircraft guns; a second battery was added in late 1942)
 Ammunition and Supply Unit
 108th Motorized Artillery Regiment (transferred to the 5th Infantry Division "Cosseria" in June 1942)
 Command Unit
 I Group (105/28 guns)
 II Group (75/18 Mod. 35 howitzers)
 III Group (75/18 Mod. 35 howitzers)
 87th Anti-aircraft Battery (20/65 Mod. 35 anti-aircraft guns)
 305th Anti-aircraft Battery (20/65 Mod. 35 anti-aircraft guns)
 Ammunition and Supply Unit
 CIII Mortar Battalion (81mm Mod. 35 mortars; joined the division in October 1942)
 303rd Anti-tank Company (47/32 anti-tank guns)
 78th Engineer Company 
 103rd Telegraph and Radio Operators Company
 103rd Medical Section
 2x Field hospitals
 1x Surgical unit
 103rd Supply Section
 Bakers Section
 148th Carabinieri Section
 149th Carabinieri Section
 94th Field Post Office

Commanding officers 
The division's commanding officers were:

 Generale di Divisione Carlo Rossi (15 March 1942 - 12 September 1943)

References 

 

Infantry divisions of Italy in World War II
Military units and formations established in 1942
Military units and formations disestablished in 1943
1942 establishments in Italy